Nea Anchialos is a town and a former municipality in Magnesia, Thessaly, Greece. Since the 2011 local government reform it is part of the municipality Volos, of which it is a municipal unit. It is situated southwest of Volos and north of Almyros, on the coast of the Pagasetic Gulf. It is located on the national highway Athens-Lamia-Volos.

History

Antiquity
The modern town is built on the ruins of the ancient city of Pyrasos (Πύρασος), and is associated with the nearby city of Thessalian or Phthiotic Thebes, near the modern village of Mikrothivai.

Homer mentions Pyrasos in his list of ships (Iliad B.695) together with Phylace and Itona, which belonged to the kingdom of Protesilaus. According to Strabo (IX.435), who discusses its topography, "well-harboured Pyrasos" (εὑλίμενος Πύρασος) was 20 stadia from Phthiotic Thebes.

Pyrasos is scarcely known from historical sources, except that it was an active harbour and featured a famous temple of Demeter and Kore, after which the harbour was later known as Demetrion. The only excavation which took place on the hill of Magoula, the old acropolis, southeast of Nea Anchialos, proves that the site was peopled since the earliest Neolithic period (6th millennium BC) by fishermen and agriculturalists. Archaeologically, the remains of Pyrasos are scant, and the city is barely known in historical times. An arm from an oversized statue, which came into light in 1965, was attributed to Demeter. Possibly the most identical finding is a small fragment of an ancient epigraph, discovered in the debris of the big Basilica D with the name Pyrasos, confirming the location of the city.

In the late 4th century BC, Pyrasos was joined (synoecism) with the neighbouring cities of Phylake and Phthiotic Thebes. The new conurbation took the name of Phthiotic or Thessalian Thebes. The city remained prosperous under Roman rule, but it was moved from the inland site of the old Phthiotic Thebes back to Pyrasos near the sea. The city's prosperity from the 4th through the 6th centuries is attested by the number of its Early Christian monuments, but was brought to an end in a great fire in the late 7th century that destroyed the city. The city was rebuilt and apparently continued to be of some note in the early Byzantine period—its bishop is last mentioned in the 8th/9th century—but never recovered and was eventually eclipsed by the nearby port city of Halmyros.

Nea Anchialos
Nea Anchialos was founded in 1906 by Greeks who fled the Black Sea town of Anchialos (modern Pomorie in Bulgaria) after massive anti-Greek riots, provoked by the Greek-Bulgarian struggle in Macedonia.

Notes

References

Nea Anchialos City guide
Municipality website
Hellenic Ministry Of Culture - Nea Anchialos/Fthiotic Thebes
Nea Anchialos Online Tourist Guide

Populated places in Magnesia (regional unit)